is a Japanese former Nippon Professional Baseball player.

External links

1971 births
Living people
Baseball people from Osaka Prefecture
Japanese baseball players
Nippon Professional Baseball infielders
Yomiuri Giants players
Japanese baseball coaches
Nippon Professional Baseball coaches